The Malaysian Buddhist Institute is a Buddhist institute of higher education providing formal training in the Chinese language to prepare candidates for the sangha orders in the Mahayana tradition. It is located in Penang, Malaysia. Established on September 18, 1969, through the efforts of the Venerable Chuk Mor, the institute is under the auspices of the Malaysian Buddhist Association.

See also
 Buddhism in Malaysia
 Education in Malaysia

References

External links 
 Malaysian Buddhist Institute (in Chinese)

1969 establishments in Malaysia
Religious organizations established in 1969
Colleges in Malaysia
Buddhist universities and colleges in Malaysia
Buddhist organisations based in Malaysia
Non-profit organisations based in Malaysia
Buddhist organizations established in the 20th century